Wu Di (born October 27, 1993) is a Chinese female international basketball player. She represented China in the women's basketball competition at the 2016 Summer Olympics.

References

External links

Chinese women's basketball players
Basketball players at the 2016 Summer Olympics
Olympic basketball players of China
1993 births
Living people
Guards (basketball)
People from Fengcheng, Liaoning
Sportspeople from Dandong
Basketball players from Liaoning
Tianjin University of Finance and Economics alumni
Shanxi Flame players